John A. Dietz (November 24, 1870 – October 11, 1939) was an American sport shooter who competed at the 1908 Summer Olympics and the 1912 Summer Olympics. He won two gold medals as part of the American pistol team.

In 1908 he also competed in the individual pistol event and finished ninth. In 1912 he finished fourth in the 30 metre military pistol team event. He also competed in the 30 metre rapid fire pistol event finishing fourth and in the 50 metre pistol finishing again ninth.

References

External links
profile

1870 births
1939 deaths
American male sport shooters
ISSF pistol shooters
Shooters at the 1908 Summer Olympics
Shooters at the 1912 Summer Olympics
Olympic gold medalists for the United States in shooting
Olympic medalists in shooting
Medalists at the 1908 Summer Olympics
Medalists at the 1912 Summer Olympics